Every Man Has a Woman is a tribute album to Yoko Ono for her 50th birthday. It contains covers of her songs from the albums Approximately Infinite Universe (1973), Double Fantasy (1980), Season of Glass (1981), and It's Alright (I See Rainbows) (1982). The album was purportedly one of John Lennon's projects, but he died before he could see its completion. The liner notes for the vinyl LP feature an essay by Ono entitled "A Crystal Ball".

Another tribute album to Ono in a similar vein entitled Yes, I'm a Witch was released to very positive reviews in 2007, featuring such artists as Peaches, Cat Power and The Flaming Lips.

Track listing
All words and music by Yoko Ono
 "Every Man Has a Woman Who Loves Him" – 3:32 - John Lennon produced by John Lennon, Yoko Ono and Jack Douglas
 "Silver Horse" – 3:07 - Harry Nilsson produced by Harry Nilsson and Rick Riccio
 "I'm Moving On" – 2:47 - Eddie Money produced by Andy Johns and Eddie Money
 "Nobody Sees Me Like You Do" – 3:23 - Rosanne Cash produced by Rodney Crowell and Rosanne Cash
 "Dogtown" – 3:26 - Alternating Boxes produced and arranged by Guy Manganiello
 "Goodbye Sadness" – 3:22 - Roberta Flack produced by Ralph MacDonald and Roberta Flack
 "Walking on Thin Ice" – 3:46 - Elvis Costello and The Attractions (with The TKO Horns) produced  by Allen Toussaint
 "Wake Up" – 2:22 - Trio produced by Klaus Voormann
 "Dream Love" – 3:46 - Harry Nilsson produced by Harry Nilsson and Rick Riccio
 "Now or Never" – 3:44 - Spirit Choir produced by John Lennon, Yoko Ono and the Plastic Ono Band 
 "Loneliness" – 3:42 - Harry Nilsson produced by Harry Nilsson and Rick Riccio
 "It's Alright" – 2:27 - Sean Lennon produced by Yoko Ono and Sean Lennon

Singles
 "Every Man Has a Woman Who Loves Him" (John Lennon) / "It's Alright" (Sean Lennon) (7")
 "Silver Horse" / "Dream Love" (Harry Nilsson) (7")
 "Loneliness" (Harry Nilsson) (7")
 "Dogtown" (Alternating Boxes) (12")

References

Yoko Ono albums
1984 albums
Tribute albums